Inonotopsis is a fungal genus  in the family Hymenochaetaceae. The genus is monotypic, containing the single species Inonotopsis subiculosa, which is widespread in north temperate regions.

References

Hymenochaetaceae
Monotypic Basidiomycota genera